is a Japanese video game developer and publisher. They are primarily known for hosting the Japanese server of Ragnarok Online (developed by its listed Korean subsidiary Gravity), as well as their development of Ragnarok DS for the Nintendo DS. More recently, the company has reported huge financial success thanks to its mobile game Puzzle & Dragons, which, in 2013, was reportedly responsible for 91% of the company's $1.6 billion revenues for the year.

History

The company was established as ONSale Co., Ltd. on July 1, 1998, as a joint venture between Softbank and onSale Inc. to engage in the online interactive auction business in the US.
In 2000, the company moved its headquarters to Chiyoda, Tokyo, Japan and changed its focus to providing auction systems, etc. using ASP.
In 2002, the company once again changed its focus, this time to Online Game Services. Primarily hosting the Japanese server of Ragnarok Online.
In 2004 the company began joint development of online games with Game Arts Co., Ltd.
In March 2005, the company was listed on the Hercules Nippon New Market.
In August 2005, the company invested in G-Mode Co., Ltd. a game manufacturer for mobile phones.
In December 2005, the MMORPG developed by GungHo, Emil Chronicle Online, was officially released.
In August 2006, they completed the contract to distribute Ragnarok Online II.
In October 2007,  GungHo Works, Inc., behind the development of Ragnarok DS, was established.
In November 2007, the company acquired the video game assets of Interchannel from Index Corporation.
In April 2008, Gravity Co., Ltd. was acquired as a subsidiary.
In January 2013, GungHo acquired Grasshopper Manufacture, the studio behind titles such as Killer7, the No More Heroes franchise and Lollipop Chainsaw.
On June 3, 2016, Softbank agreed to sell most of its stake in GungHo (approximately 23.47%) for about $685 million, which would end Softbank's majority ownership of the company, resulting in Gungho no longer being an associate of Softbank. The offer was accepted by Gungho and completed by June 22, thus allowing Gungho to become an independent company.
In October 2021, GungHo sold Grasshopper Manufacture to NetEase.

Games

Active online games
TEPPEN (July 4, 2019)
Ragnarok Online (December 1, 2001)
Tantra (March 10, 2004)
Emil Chronicle Online (August 1, 2005)
Hiten Online (April 19, 2007)
ROSE Online (March 26, 2009)
Lucent Heart (2009)
Blade Chronicle (2009)
Ragnarok DS (February 1, 2010)
Eternal City 2 (June 23, 2010)
Divina (September 9, 2010)
Grand Fantasia
ROSE Online
Le Ciel Bleu
Toy Wars
Fishdom: Seasons under the Sea
Puzzle & Dragons
Summons Board
Chrono Ma:Gia (2018)
Ragnarok Mobile (2019)
Ninjala (2020)

Inactive online gamesSurvival Project (June 29, 2004 - August 31, 2006)A3 (October 15, 2004 - November 1, 2007)Saiyuki Reload Gunlock (September 1, 2004 - January 31, 2006)Squirrel Pot 2 (May 25, 2004 - December 28, 2007)eXtreme Soccer (β August 11, 2006 – 2008)Mahjong (May 31, 2007 - March 26, 2008)Koi Koi Playing Cards (May 31, 2007 - March 26, 2008)Poker (May 31, 2007 - March 26, 2008)Millionaire (May 31, 2007 - March 26, 2008)Shanghai (May 31, 2007 - March 26, 2008)Chat (May 31, 2007 - March 26, 2008)Ragnarok Online II (β May 28, 2007 - August 2010)Pachinko Slot (September 6, 2007 - November 4, 2008)Hakenden (June 4, 2008 - October 29, 2008)Yogurting (September 1, 2005 - May, 2010)Tetris Online (October 23, 2007 - July 5, 2011)Shin Megami Tensei: Imagine (June 26, 2007 - May, 2016)
Grandia Online (August 26, 2009 - September 28, 2012)

PC
Grandia II: Anniversary Edition
Let It Die
Grandia HD Collection (Grandia & Grandia II Remaster)

PlayStation 2
Nadepro!!: Kisama mo Seiyū Yattemiro!

PlayStation Portable
Solfege: Sweet Harmony
Mimana Iyar Chronicle
Cho Aniki Zero
P.W: Project Witch
Lunar: Silver Star Harmony
Ragnarok Tactics

PlayStation 3
Ragnarok Odyssey Ace

PlayStation Vita
Ragnarok Odyssey
Ragnarok Odyssey Ace
Picotto Knights
Dokuro

PlayStation 4
Let It Die

Nintendo DS
Otometeki Koi Kakumei Love Revo!!
Nakamura Tooru Kanshuu: India Shiki Keisan Drill DS (The Method of Indian Calculation)
Aquazone DS
Ragnarok DS
Hero's Saga Laevatein Tactics
Minna de Jibun no Setsumeisho: B-Gata, A-Gata, AB-Gata, O-Gata
Ecolis: Aoi Umi to Ugoku Shima

Nintendo 3DS 

 Puzzle & Dragons Z + Super Mario Bros. Edition
 Puzzle & Dragons X (Japan only)

Nintendo Switch 

 Grandia HD Collection (Grandia & Grandia II Remaster)
 Puzzle & Dragons Gold
 Ninjala
 Volta-X
 Galak-Z: Variant S

Mobile
Teppen (Battle Project)
Ragnarok Online
Casino Komodo
Puzzles and Dragons
Yo-kai Watch World
 Galak-Z: Variant Mobile

References

External links
Official Website (Japanese)
Official Website (English)
GungHo Online Entertainment America Official Website

 
Entertainment companies of Japan
Japanese brands
Japanese companies established in 1998
SoftBank Group
Software companies based in Tokyo
Video game companies established in 1998
Video game companies of Japan
Video game development companies
Video game publishers